Lotus Shopping Centre is a mall near the Bikarnakatte flyover at Kulshekar in Mangalore. It is situated in the heart of Mangalore. It is located adjacent to national highway near Nanthoor circle, which is one of the busiest circles in Mangalore. Once completed, it will be the largest mall in Mangalore, second largest in Karnataka and among top ten in India.

Targeted at catering to the mid and high-end segment, the property is being developed with a retail mall at the front and a three star business hotel towards the rear. With Gross leasable area of 900,000 sq.ft for total development including hotel, 1.23 million sq/ft gross built area, 1000 underground car parking spaces, 120 retail units with hypermarket, 8 screen cinema and 1 auditorium.

References

Proposed buildings and structures in India
Shopping malls in Mangalore